Ematheudes rhodochroa is a species of snout moth in the genus Ematheudes. It was described by George Hampson in 1918 and is known from the Democratic Republic of the Congo, Kenya, and South Africa.

References

Moths described in 1918
Anerastiini